Sunil Nath (Assamese: সুনীল নাথ), alias Siddhartha Phukan, is SULFA leader, and was a former Central Publicity Secretary and spokesman of ULFA. He had been holding the post to 1992 after the death of Uddipta Hazarika when the ULFA was at its peak. The charge was later taken over by Mithinga Daimary. Now he is a columnist and the editor of the Assamese daily Asomiya Khabar and e-journal Voice of Assam. He writes on insurgency and development issues related to Assam in several newspapers and academic journal within and outside the state.

Surrender
On March 31, 1992, Nath came overground and surrendered to then chief minister of Assam Hiteswar Saikia. He led the first batch of the outfit to surrender.

See also
People's Consultative Group
List of top leaders of ULFA
Sanjukta Mukti Fouj

References

Living people
Year of birth missing (living people)